Ilıcaköy can refer to:

 Ilıcaköy, Hınıs
 Ilıcaköy, Gazipaşa
 Ilıcaköy, Antalya
 Ilıcaköy, Taşova
 Ilıcaköy, Kozan